Henri-Raymond Casgrain (December 16, 1831 – February 11, 1904) was a French Canadian Roman Catholic priest, author, publisher, and professor of history.

Life

Born in Rivière-Ouelle, Lower Canada, the son Charles-Eusèbe Casgrain and Eliza Anne Baby, Casgrain studied at College of Sainte-Anne-de-la-Pocatière. In 1852, he enrolled in the Montreal School of Medicine and Surgery, but became a priest in 1856. He started teaching at the College of Sainte-Anne-de-la-Pocatière until he was forced to give up teaching because of ill health. In 1859, he was appointed curate of the parish of La Nativité-de-Notre-Dame at Beauport and was free to devote himself entirely to literary pursuits.

In 1877, he was awarded a doctorate of history from the Universite Laval, where he would remain as professor.

He wrote primarily on New France and its personalities, such as Samuel de Champlain, Louis-Joseph de Montcalm and his aide-de-camp Francis de Gaston, Chevalier de Levis.

From 1889 to 1890, he was the president of the Royal Society of Canada.

Selected bibliography
 Pélerinage au pays d'Évangéline (1855)
 Histoire de la Mère Marie de l'Incarnation (1864)
 Découverte du tombeau de Champlain (1866) with Laverdiere
 Histoire de l'Hôtel-Dieu de Québec (1878)
 Une paroisse canadienne au XVIIe siècle (1880)
 Histoire de l'asile du Bon-Pasteur de Québec (1890)
 Guerre du Canada: Montcalm et Lévis (1891, v.1)
 Guerre du Canada: Montcalm et Lévis (1891, v.2)
 Les français au Canada: Montcalm et Lévis
 Une seconde Acadie (1894)
 Les Sulpiciens et les prêtres des Missions étrangères en Acadie(1897)
 Éclaircissements sur la question acadienne
 Champlain : sa vie et son caractère (1898)

See also
 Francis Parkman
 Montcalm and Wolfe

References

External links
 

Beaubien-Casgrain family
1831 births
1904 deaths
Canadian male non-fiction writers
19th-century Canadian Roman Catholic priests
Writers from Quebec
Canadian non-fiction writers in French
Academic staff of Université Laval
19th-century Canadian historians
19th-century Canadian male writers